West Central Franklin is an unorganized territory located in Franklin County, Maine. As of the 2020 census, the location had a total population of 1. Most of this area has never been organized. The only exception was a short-lived incorporated town in the 19th century (Township 6 was briefly incorporated as the town of Berlin).

Geography 
According to the United States Census Bureau, the location has a total area of 104.7 square miles (271.2 km2), of which, 104.0 square miles (269.3 km2) of it is land and 0.7 square miles (1.9 km2) of it is water. The total area is 0.69% water.

The territory consists of three townships along the western edge of the county, south of Rangeley Plantation and north of Weld, namely Township D, Township E, and Township 6 (North of Weld).

Demographics 

As of the 2010 Census, there are no people living in the location.

References

Unorganized territories in Maine
Populated places in Franklin County, Maine